Ezz El-Dine Ahmed Mourad Zulficar (Egyptian Arabic: عز الدين ذو الفقار, ; October 28, 1919 – July 1, 1963) was an Egyptian film director, screenwriter, actor and producer known for his distinctive style, which blends romance and action. Zulficar is widely regarded one of the most influential filmmakers in Egyptian Cinema's golden age.

Early life 
Ezz El-Dine Ahmed Mourad Zulficar was born in Cairo on October 28, 1919, to Ahmed Mourad Bey Zulfikar, a senior director of police and his wife Nabila Hanem Zulfikar, a housewife. He was the fifth among eight siblings. His brother Mohamed who would grow up to be a businessman, Soad, Fekreya, Mahmoud, who would grow up to be a director and actor. They were followed by brothers Kamal, Salah, the famous actor and producer and finally Mamdouh who would grow up to be a businessman. Ezz Eldine's childhood shaped his personality, for he was attracted to sports in general, especially wrestling, swimming, and gymnastics in which he won some school championships. He was an avid reader and loved to listen to classical music. He was into buying every new record released in Egypt; a hobby he cherished until his death.

Zulficar was introduced to the cinematic world at the age of nine when his elder brother Mahmoud took him to the cinema theatre to watch Egyptian and foreign films. His passion for cinema was evident when he would watch three films in a row. If he particularly liked one movie he would watch it several times.

Career 
Zulficar was a prodigy. He received a scholarship and studied astronomy. After high school, he joined the Military College to please his father, although Zulficar didn't object to the idea itself, for he saw that learning military studies would widen his perceptions. During that period, he was acquainted with a number of prominent figures that shaped Egyptian politics later on, such as presidents Gamal Abdel Nasser and Anwar El Sadat, Yusuf Sibai and Tharwat Okasha and other members of the Free Officers Movement, who mounted the July 1952 Revolution. And later he was nominated twice for Minister of Culture position, but he turned down the state position.
Zulficar graduated from the Egyptian Military Academy  and later became a captain. Despite being a distinguished officer, a tragic event shook Zulficar to the core. His father, to whom he was very close, died. He suffered a depression and his brothers advised him to change his lifestyle and career. And indeed, he resigned with the rank of captain in the artillery corps to start a career in the movie business.At that point, Zulficar remembered his strong friendship with director Kamal Selim and their cinematic discussions. Through Selim he got to know a number of coevals who became directors: Mohamed Abdel-Gawad, Salah Abu Seif, Kamel El-Telmissany and Fatin Abdel Wahab, who had just resigned from the Armed Forces and began working in cinema. He was influenced by his brother, Mahmoud Zulfikar, who was an actor, director, actor and screenwriter. He started as director Mohamed Abdel Gawad's assistant. In 1947, he directed his first film, Prisoner of Darkness (أسير الظلام, “Aseer al-Zalam”). One of his most successful movies as a director was Back Again (رُدّ قلبي, "Rod Qalby") (1957) which was featured for six weeks in Cairo's cinemas. Not to mention his masterpiece; The River of Love (1960) starring Omar Sharif.

In the late 1950s, Zulficar started Ezz El-Dine Zulficar Films, a production company with this younger brother Salah Zulfikar, together they produced major films including The Second Man (الرجل الثاني, “Al Rajul Al Thani”) (1959), Among the Ruins (بين الأطلال, “Bain Al Atlal”) (1959) and Struggle of the Heroes (صراع الأبطال, “Sira’ Al Abtal”) (1962).

Zulficar also acted in Khulud (خُلود, "Immortality") along with Hamama. As a writer he was quite successful. He wrote scripts and stories for almost 30 films. His last two ventures were the direction and scriptwriting for the films; Appointment at the Tower (موعد في البُرج, "Maw'ed Fi al-Borg") (1962) with Salah Zulfikar and Soad Hosny in the leads, and Black Candles (الشموع السوداء, "Al-Shomou' Al-Sawdaa") (1962) with Saleh Selim and Nagat in the leads. Ezz-El Dine Zulficar directed three films listed in Top 100 Egyptian films of the 20th century.

Personal life 

Zulficar met Faten Hamama while filming the Abu Zayd al-Hilali (أبو زيد الهلالي, “Abuzeid al-Hilali”) (1947), which he directed. The two fell in love and married each other. The couple had a daughter, Nadia Zulficar. Their marriage would only last for seven years, as the couple divorced in 1954. The two remained friends, and Hamama even acted in his movies after the divorce.

Afterwards, Zulficar fell in love with the beautiful actress Kawthar Shafik. This love story resulted with marriage in 1954. The couple had one daughter, Dina Zulficar. They remained married until his death in 1963.

Death 
Ezz El-Dine Zulficar died at the age of 43 on July 1, 1963 in Cairo, Egypt. Despite his young age, he left a great legacy in the history of Egyptian Cinema.

Honours 
: Order of Sciences and Arts (1st class).

Selected awards
Ezz El-Dine Zulficar has received several awards throughout his career, including:
 The second state prize in directing for the film I'm the Past, 1951.
 Prize of the Egyptian Catholic Center Film Festival for the film Wafaa, 1953
 Prize of the Egyptian Catholic Center Film Festival for the film Appointment with Life in 1953.
 The Lebanese Press Award for the film Appointment with Life in 1953.
 State Prize for the best story for film, Portsaid, 1957.
 State Prize in Production for Struggle of the Heroes in 1963.
 State Prize for Screenplay for Struggle of the Heroes in 1963.

Filmography

Director

Screenwriter

Producer

Actor

See also 
 Egyptian cinema
 Top 100 Egyptian films
 Lists of Egyptian films

References

External links
Filmography, IMDb. Retrieved on 26 November 2006.
Biography, Yalla Cinema. Retrieved on 26 November 2006.

Egyptian male film actors
Egyptian film directors
Egyptian film producers
Egyptian screenwriters
Film people from Cairo
1919 births
1963 deaths
20th-century Egyptian male actors
20th-century screenwriters